The 12th Annual GMA Dove Awards were held on 1981 recognizing accomplishments of musicians for the year 1980. The show was held in Nashville, Tennessee.

External links
 

GMA Dove Awards
1981 music awards
1981 in American music
1981 in Tennessee
GMA